Pomeroy may refer to:

Places

United Kingdom 
 Pomeroy, County Tyrone, a village, civil parish and town land in Northern Ireland
 Pomeroy, Derbyshire, a place in Derbyshire, England
 Berry Pomeroy, a village and civil parish in the South Hams district of Devon, England

United States 
 Pomeroy, Iowa
 Pomeroy, Ohio
 Pomeroy, Pennsylvania
 Pomeroy, Washington

South Africa 
 Pomeroy, KwaZulu-Natal

People 
 see Pomeroy (surname)
 Pomeroy Parker (1874–1946), private serving in the United States Marine Corps during the Spanish–American War who received the Medal of Honor for bravery
 Pomeroy Tucker (1802–1870), journalist and New York politician

Characters 
 Craig Pomeroy, character from the TV series Baywatch
 Gina Pomeroy, character from the TV series Baywatch
 Karen Pomeroy, played by Drew Barrymore, in the 2001 movie Donnie Darko

Rail 
 Pomeroy and Newark Railroad, a predecessor of the Pennsylvania Railroad in the U.S. states of Delaware and Pennsylvania
 Pomeroy railway station, railroad station in Pomeroy, County Tyrone, Northern Ireland

Other 
 Pomeroy scale in jazz, also known as the altered scale
 , a United States Navy cargo ship
 Berry Pomeroy Castle, a Tudor mansion within the walls of an earlier castle
 Pomeroy procedure for tubal ligation in female sterilization developed by Ralph Pomeroy

See also